Frank Dobias (born May 11, 1900) was an illustrator of children's books.  Among many other works, his illustrations for the Japanese version of Little Black Sambo made the book a bestseller in Japan, selling well over a million copies between 1953 and 1988.

Early life and career 
He was born in Gloggnitz, Austria and moved to the United States 1923, where he started his professional career as illustrator mostly for Macmillan Publishers books. The illustrations used in the Japanese best-seller were originally drawn for   Little Black Sambo  published from Macmillan in 1927.

The Macmillan 1927 version was revived from Komichi Shobo Publishing, a Japanese publisher in Tokyo, in 2008.

Selected works
Bannerman, Helen.  Little Black Sambo.  The Happy Hour Books. Macmillan Publishers, 1927.
Siebe, Josephine. Kasperle’s Adventures. Translated by Florence Geiser. Macmillan Publishers, 1929.
Morris, William.  Sons of the Volsungs.  Adapted by Dorothy Hosford from Sigurd the Volsung by William Morris. Macmillan Publishers, 1932.
Junior Bible. Macmillan Publishers, 1936.
Cook, Canfield. Sky Attack. New York: Grosset & Dunlap, 1942. 
Kelsey, Alice (Geer). Once the Hodja. Longman’s 1943.　 Jeremy Schiff's Hodja homepage contains some illustrations by Frank Dobias for  Once the Hodja.
Bannerman, Helen.  Chibikuro Sambo.  Komichi Shobo Publishing, 2008. (A Japanese translation of Macmillan's 1927 version.)

References

1900 births
Year of death missing
American illustrators
Austrian emigrants to the United States